Robin White (born 8 September 1960) is a former Australian rules footballer who played with Melbourne in the Victorian Football League (VFL) and South Adelaide in the South Australian National Football League (SANFL).

Notes

External links 
		
DemonWiki page

1960 births
Australian rules footballers from South Australia
Melbourne Football Club players
South Adelaide Football Club players
Living people
South Australian State of Origin players
Prahran Football Club players